Johan Arturo Alexander Madrid Reyes (born 26 November 1996) is a Peruvian professional footballer who plays as a defender for Sporting Cristal in the Peruvian Primera División.

Madrid won the Peruvian league with Cristal in 2016. He has also played for Cienciano and Sport Rosario in the Peruvian top division.

International career
On 17 August 2018, he was called up by Ricardo Gareca to the full international squad for friendly matches against Germany and Netherlands.

References

External links 

Living people
1996 births
Peruvian footballers
Peru international footballers
Sporting Cristal footballers
Peruvian Primera División players
Cienciano footballers
Sportspeople from Callao
Association football defenders